Live 1973 is a live album by Gram Parsons and the Fallen Angels. It was recorded at Ultra Sonic Recording Studios in Hempstead, New York on March 13, 1973 during a live radio broadcast from WLIR-FM, a station located in Garden City, New York. The timing of the recording thus sandwiched it between Parsons' only two solo studio albums, GP, and Grievous Angel, although it was not officially released (on LP) until 1982, long after Parsons' 1973 death at age 26.

Overview
As with both of Parsons' solo studio albums, Emmylou Harris provides prominent duet and harmony vocals. The Fallen Angels, however, were a different band than that which appeared on Parsons' two solo albums. As Parsons and Harris prepared to tour the United States in 1973 to promote his solo debut, GP, James Burton, Ronnie Tutt, and most of the band who performed on the album had prior commitments to Elvis Presley's TCB Band. Parsons instead assembled a crew of roadhouse pickers he dubbed "the Fallen Angels", and they began making their way through America's rock clubs and honky tonks.

The original album had eleven tracks, but included a 7" 45rpm record with the encore medley on side one, and an interview with Parsons, Harris, and Jock Bartley plus a version of the Flying Burrito Brothers' "Hot Burrito #1" performed by Gene Parsons in tribute as the B-side. When later reissued by Rhino Records on CD in 1994. the medley and in between song patter were added but the interview segments and the Gene Parsons track were omitted.

Track listing
"We'll Sweep Out the Ashes in the Morning" (Joyce Allsup) - 3:34
"Country Baptizing" (Jim Shumate) - 3:50
"Drug Store Truck Drivin' Man" (Roger McGuinn, Gram Parsons) - 4:33
"Big Mouth Blues" (Gram Parsons) - 4:34
"The New Soft Shoe" (Gram Parsons) - 5:02
"Cry One More Time" (Peter Wolf, Seth Justman) - 5:22
"Streets of Baltimore" (Tompall Glaser, Harlan Howard) - 3:08
"That's All It Took" (Darrell Edwards, Charlotte Grier, George Jones) - 2:45
"Love Hurts" (Boudleaux Bryant) - 4:31
"California Cotton Fields" (Dallas Frazier, Earl Montgomery) - 2:32
"Six Days on the Road" (Earl Green, Carl Montgomery) - 3:04
"Encore Medley: Bony Maronie/Forty Days/Almost Grown" (Larry Williams/Chuck Berry) - 5:50

Personnel
 Gram Parsons – lead vocals, acoustic guitar
 Emmylou Harris – harmony vocals, lead vocals on "Country Baptizing", acoustic guitar
Fallen Angels
 Neil Flanz – pedal steel guitar
 N. D. Smart II – drums; harmony vocals on "The New Soft Shoe" and "Streets of Baltimore"
 Kyle Tullis – bass guitar
 Jock Bartley – electric guitar

References

Gram Parsons live albums
1982 live albums